Ovipennis is a genus of moths in the subfamily Arctiinae. The genus was erected by George Hampson in 1900.

Species
 Ovipennis binghami Hampson, 1903
 Ovipennis dudgeoni Elwes, 1890

References

Lithosiini
Moth genera